Walter Byrd (born 1942) is a retired American basketball player. He played collegiately for Temple University. Professionally, Byrd played for the Miami Floridians in the American Basketball Association (ABA) for 22 games, as well as for a number of teams in the Eastern Professional Basketball League.

External links

1942 births
Living people
American men's basketball players
Camden Bullets players
Miami Floridians players
New Haven Elms players
Power forwards (basketball)
Sunbury Mercuries players
Temple Owls men's basketball players
Trenton Colonials players
Wilkes-Barre Barons players